The United Democratic Alliance is a state-level political alliance in the Indian state of Nagaland.

Background
In the run-up to the 2018 Nagaland Legislative Assembly election, the ruling Naga People's Front split over whether to continue its coalition with the Bharatiya Janata Party. A rebel group led by former chief minister Neiphiu Rio created the Nationalist Democratic Progressive Party, and the NDPP and BJP contested the election in alliance. They won the election, and formed a coalition government under Rio, with the NPF serving as the opposition. The government was called the People's Democratic Alliance.

Formation
On 22 July 2021, the NPF announced its intention to join the state government, which was ratified by the PDA on 11 August, resulting in the formation of an all-party government. The NPF cited a shared need to resolve the "Naga political issue" and the ongoing negotiations with the National Socialist Council of Nagalim and other separatist groups as the reason for its decision. The new government was initially called the Nagaland Unity Government, but Rio later announced that its name would be the United Democratic Alliance. Several news outlets dubbed the new government "Opposition-less", as all seats in the Legislative Assembly are held by constituent parties. The formation of such a government was criticised by some, with The Naga Rising calling it "a fraud on the people" and noting that there was already an all-party committee on resolving the Naga issue. The Kohima District Congress Committee expressed similar views.

See also
National unity government
National Democratic Alliance
North-East Democratic Alliance
Fourth Neiphiu Rio ministry
51st New Brunswick Legislature, another Commonwealth legislature with a one-party composition

References

Political parties established in 2021
Government of Nagaland

References

Political parties established in 2021
Government of Nagaland